Lethe Vallis is a valley in the Elysium Planitia on Mars, located at 4° North and 206.5° West.  It is 225 km long and is named after river Lethe in Katmai National Monument, Alaska, USA.  Lethe Vallis originates at the SE margin of the West Elysium Basin (Cerberus Palus).  West Elysium Basin probably contained a lake that was 500 km across and received water from Athabasca Vallis.  It was probably formed in just days or weeks and had a discharge about like the Mississippi.  Some have suggested it was formed from lava flows, but lava would not be able to flow over such a low gradient for so long a distance.

References

Valleys and canyons on Mars
Elysium quadrangle